Belgium is a country in Europe and member of major international organizations like the European Union and NATO which are both headquartered in Brussels, Belgium.

As a federal state, the Communities and Regions have their own foreign relations and are able to conclude treaties themselves.

Initial neutrality

Because of its location at the crossroads of Western Europe, Belgium has historically been the route of invading armies from its larger neighbours. With virtually defenceless borders, Belgium has traditionally sought to avoid domination by the more powerful nations which surround it through a policy of mediation. The Concert of Europe sanctioned the creation of Belgium in 1831 on the condition that the country remain strictly neutral.

This policy of neutrality ended after the experience of German occupation during World War I. In the years preceding World War II, Belgium tried to return to a policy of neutrality, but once again, Germany invaded the country. In 1948, Belgium signed the Treaty of Brussels with the United Kingdom, France, the Netherlands, and Luxembourg, and one year later became one of the founding members of the Atlantic Alliance.

European integration
The Belgians have been strong advocates of European integration, and most aspects of their foreign, economic, and trade policies are coordinated through the European Union (EU), which has its main headquarters (the European Commission, the Council of the European Union and sessions of the European Parliament) in Brussels. Belgium's postwar customs union with the Netherlands and Luxembourg paved the way for the formation of the European Community (precursor to the EU), of which Belgium was a founding member.

Likewise, the Benelux abolition of internal border controls was a model for the wider Schengen Accord, which today is integrated in the acquis communautaire and aims at common visa policies and free movement of people across common borders. At the same time the Belgians, perceiving their diminutive role on the international scene, are strong advocates of strengthening economic and political integration within the EU. Belgium actively seeks improved relations with the new democracies of central and eastern Europe through such fora as the Organization for Security and Cooperation in Europe, EU association agreements, and NATO's Partnership for Peace with the former Warsaw Pact countries and several others.

North Atlantic Treaty Organization (NATO)
Belgium remains a strong proponent of NATO. It cooperates closely with the United States within the alliance framework, in addition to supporting European defense efforts through the Western European Union (WEU). Both NATO (since 1966) and the EU have their headquarters in Brussels; SHAPE (Supreme Headquarters Allied Powers Europe) is in the south of the country, near Mons. Since January 1993, the WEU has been headquartered in Brussels.

Belgium and NATO

Belgium has been one of the strongest supporters of NATO since the inception of the alliance in 1949. Having suffered through two invasions in two world wars, Belgium was aware of its security needs and the limitations of its means for self-defense. As a result, the leaders of that nation began calling for the formation of a defensive alliance shortly after the liberation of Belgium at the end of World War II. In March 1948 Belgium joined with France, Luxembourg, the Netherlands, and Britain in an agreement to establish a joint defense system. This agreement, known as the Treaty of Brussels, was a recognition that individual national responses to the threat of aggression were inadequate and that a united defense effort was necessary for mutual security.

In 1948, after expressions of concern by several European states that the Treaty of Brussels was too limited in scope and effectiveness, the prime minister of Canada called for a mutual defense system comprising Western Europe and North America. On 4 April 1949, the foreign minister of Belgium joined with representatives from Britain, Canada, Denmark, France, Iceland, Italy, Luxembourg, the Netherlands, Norway, Portugal, and the United States in signing the treaty forming NATO. Greece and Turkey became members in 1952, West Germany joined the alliance in 1955, and Spain became a member in 1982. The treaty established NATO as a multilateral political alliance that binds its members to obligations of mutual defense and economic cooperation.

During the Cold War, Belgium's major NATO roles included: (1) participating in the defense of the central European region by air-land defense of an army corps area in the Federal Republic of Germany (FRG); (2) military defense of its national territory and its immediate sea approaches, and the organization, defense and support of allied Lines of Communication (LOC); and (3) maintaining a mobile Belgian task force with a land component issued from a para-commando regiment and an air transport command.

Belgium has influenced the alliance policy in many ways. One of the country's most prominent international statesmen, Paul Henri Spaak, served as secretary general of NATO from 1957 to 1961. When France withdrew from the military operations of NATO in 1966, the Supreme Headquarters Allied Powers Europe was transferred to Mons, in a rural area southwest of Brussels. Six months later, the organization's political headquarters was also relocated to Brussels.

In 1967 the North Atlantic Council formally adopted a proposal, formulated by Belgian foreign minister Pierre Harmel, that altered the nature of NATO policy. The Harmel plan called for NATO to be partially transformed from an entirely defensive system to one designed to encourage East-West détente and increased political consultation among the members of the alliance. By the late 1970s, however, the optimistic policy of East- West rapprochement had deteriorated. Arms control negotiations were not achieving results, and the NATO countries became increasingly concerned about the Soviet military buildup.

In December 1979 the members of NATO decided to modernize the Europe-based United States nuclear arsenal by deploying 572 new ground-launched missile systems in Western Europe that were capable of reaching the Soviet Union. The deployment would consist of 108 Pershing II ballistic missiles and 464 BGM-109G Ground Launched Cruise Missiles (GLCM), all armed with single nuclear warheads. The missiles were to be deployed in five countries: the Pershing IIs and some cruise missiles in West Germany and cruise missiles only in Britain, Italy, the Netherlands, and Belgium. The NATO allies also agreed to attempt negotiations with the Soviet Union in order to limit further nuclear deployment in Europe. The NATO decision was an integrated, or dual-track, approach involving both modernization and arms control negotiation.

During the consultations that preceded the NATO decision, the Belgian coalition government was described as supportive of the proposed missile deployment. The NATO ministers expected the government to endorse the proposal and accept the missile deployment on Belgian territory. Domestic opposition, especially from the Dutch-speaking Socialist Party Differently (SF), however, caused the government to condition its support for the deployment policy. Belgium endorsed the decision to modernize the nuclear capability of NATO but wavered on its applicability to Belgian territory. The government was unable to concentrate fully on the issue of deployment in 1979 because of its preoccupation with linguistic and economic issues.

In September 1980, however, the government issued an ambiguous "non-decision" that allowed supporters and opponents of deployment to claim victory. Belgian acceptance was linked to progress in the Intermediate Nuclear Force (INF), negotiations being conducted by the United States and NATO with the Soviet Union and the Warsaw Pact. If the negotiations did not succeed in lessening tensions between the states, then Belgium would, "in concert with its Allies, take all the measures agreed upon by the NATO partners (in 1979)," i.e., would allow the missiles to be stationed on Belgian territory. There would also be semiannual review of this 1980 policy until a firm decision could be made.

The SP continued to be the political group most strongly opposed to deployment. It made opposition to deployment one of its reasons for participating in the government, and its leaders have made a considerable political investment in the issue. The leader of the SP, Karel Van Miert, saw the initial NATO decision as an example of overwhelming American pressure on the Europeans and stressed that deployment in Belgium be linked to a possible INF agreement with the Soviet Union. However, the underlying rationale for opposition by the SF may have been lack of economic gain to the Dutch-speaking areas of Belgium.

The opposition may also have been mounted as a reaction to the strong anti-nuclear sentiment in neighboring countries, namely, the Netherlands and West Germany. The French-speaking Socialist Party (PS) has not seriously opposed deployment. The lack of PS opposition may have been positively influenced by the economic benefits to Wallonia that would result from deployment in that region.

Because of the fragility of coalition politics, as well as the continued economic strain in late 1984, the Belgian government was still unable to make a firm decision on cruise missile deployment. It has nonetheless taken initial steps to implement the plan, including the selection and construction of a site for the missiles at Florennes. A large number of Belgian officials continued to support the NATO dual-track decision and stressed Belgian willingness to counteract any increased Soviet threat to Western Europe. Nevertheless, in late 1984 it seemed likely that the government would continue to postpone a final decision as long as possible.

The approval of the 1983 Belgian decision to accept Ground Launched Cruise Missiles (GLCM) at Florennes, Belgium, and its subsequent implementation, was a highly political and controversial issue. During the negotiations, however, there was never a question of Belgium's support for the NATO alliance. Indeed, when the time came to act, Prime Minister Wilfried Martens announced in March 1985 his government's final agreement to the installation of the missiles.

Despite some opposition, Belgium generally supported the NATO modernization programs for air defense and intermediate-range nuclear weapons. Ground-launched cruise missiles were assigned to a base in Florennes in the province of Namur and were expected to be operational by early 1985; however, the final decision on Belgian acceptance of the missiles was subject to domestic political considerations. In late 1984, improvements in the air defense system were subject to intense debate; decisions to upgrade the existing defense system were based on economic, not military, considerations.

Subregional integration with the Netherlands and Luxembourg
Belgium has been involved in (sub)regional integration since the first half of the 20th century, first with the Belgium-Luxembourg Economic Union, founded in 1925, and then, since 1944, with the Netherlands and Luxembourg in the Benelux.

Belgium's federalism and international relations
A peculiar feature of Belgian federalism is the fact that the country's Communities and Regions maintain their own international relations, including the conclusion of treaties. Thus, there are a number of bilateral Dutch-Flemish international institutions, such as the Dutch Language Union or the institutions for the control of the river Scheldt, in which only Flanders takes part. Likewise, only the French Community of Belgium takes part in La Francophonie. For instance, UNV's Online Volunteering service received a financial contribution from the Federal Public Service (FPS) Foreign Affairs, Foreign Trade and Development Cooperation of the Kingdom of Belgium for the years 2013 and 2014 to support the outreach to the francophone world and the promotion of volunteerism. Ministers of the Communities and the Regions represent Belgium in the Council of the European Union when their competencies are dealt with.

Former colonies

Belgium retains special (important) but often stormy relationships with its former colonies, Congo, Rwanda and Burundi.  The current constitution of Democratic Republic of the Congo was designed with the assistance of Belgian legal scholars.

International disputes
Belgium has resorted several times to international dispute settlement, notably in cases at both the International Court of Justice and the Permanent Court of Arbitration with the Netherlands concerning the diversion of water from the Meuse (1937) the frontier at the enclave of Baarle-Hertog (1959) and the revitalisation of the so-called Iron Rhine railroad (2005). There have been other points of contention with the Netherlands, such as the deepening of the river Scheldt or the route for the high-speed rail link between Brussels and Amsterdam. This does however not influence the overall amicable character of Belgo-Dutch relationship.

Other former cases at international courts between Belgium and other countries are — in chronological order — the Oscar Chinn Case of 1934 (with the United Kingdom, the Borghgrave Case of 1937 (with Spain), the cases of the electricity company of Sofia of 1939 (with Bulgaria), the case of the "société commerciale de Belgique" of 1939 (with Greece), the case concerning the Barcelona Traction Company of 1970 (with Spain), the arrest warrant case of 2002 (with the Democratic Republic of the Congo) and the case concerning legality of use of force of 2004 (with Serbia and Montenegro).

The arrest warrant case of 2002 was caused by the application of Belgium's so called genocide law, providing for universal jurisdiction over the gravest international crimes. The same law stirred relations with, amongst others, Israel and the United States, since complaints were filed against high-ranking politicians and officials of both countries. The law was therefore repealed in 2003.

Relationship with countries
Belgium maintains significant bilateral relations with several countries.

Africa

Americas

Asia

Europe

Oceania

Protocol 
The kingdom of Belgium recognises 4 types of incoming visits in Belgium. They are ranked in precedence and protocol.
 The State Visit, formal invitations by the King of the Belgians.
 The Official Visit, invitation by the Belgian Prime minister.
 The Working Visit, invitation by an ambassador, the cost is not paid by the Belgian state.
Cordial visits.
Visits of courtoisie
Visits to international Organisations
The Private Visit, at own initiative, Belgian authorities only provide security if requested.

See also
 Belgian order of precedence
 List of diplomatic missions in Belgium
 List of diplomatic missions of Belgium
 Visa requirements for Belgian citizens

References

External links
 Egmont Institute Commentary July 2014
 Belgian ministry of foreign affairs
 Belgian directorate-general for development co-operation
 Flemish service for foreign affairs
 Francophone service for foreign affairs